Commonly, deflation refers to a decrease in the general price level, the opposite of inflation.

Deflation may also refer to:
A release or escape of air or gas from an inflatable, resulting in its shrinking or collapsing
A mode of wind erosion
Dividing a polynomial by a linear factor which decreases its degree by one in multiple root-finding algorithms, as done for example in the Jenkins–Traub algorithm
In philosophy, the use of a deflationary theory of truth, where the term truth is rejected as a real property of propositions
Deflation (film), a 2001 short film
The Great Deflation, a period of worldwide economic deflation occurring roughly between the years 1870–90
Deflate, a widely used lossless compression algorithm originating from the program PKZIP

See also
Deflationary theory of truth
Inflation (disambiguation), the antonym of deflation